is a Japanese actor.

His breakthrough roles include Yūichi Katagiri in the Tomodachi Game live-action television drama and films and Okita Sogo in the Gintama live-action films. He is known for his expressive eyes and natural acting style. He is also known for his roles in tokusatsu, including his role as Ryūsei Sakuta, the Kamen Rider Meteor in Kamen Rider Fourze.

Career

In the beginning of 2011, Yoshizawa made his debut in Sign with other amuse actors like Dori Sakurada and Takuya Uehara. In the second half of that year, he starred in Kingyo Club. He went on to portray Ryūsei Sakuta in Kamen Rider Fourze, making his debut in the seventeenth episode. Yoshizawa was interviewed on his role by Uchūsen, the interview being featured in the 135th issue. Yoshizawa revealed his inspiration behind his character's split personality and his first experience in ADR recording. Yoshizawa compared his character to that of Light Yagami from Death Note. Yoshizawa also watched Bruce Lee films as a reference as his character frequently performed the trademark kiai of  when firing punches or kicks.

In 2017, he portrayed the role of Shinsengumi 1st Division Captain Okita Sogo in the 2017 live-action film of the popular manga series Gintama, and reprised the role in the sequel, Gintama 2, in 2018.

Personal life

Yoshizawa was born on February 1, 1994, in Tokyo, Japan. He has an older brother and two younger brothers. His specialty skills include second dan in kendo, which he's been practicing for nine years.

Filmography

TV series

Films

Others

Awards

References

External links

 Official profile 
 

1994 births
Living people
Japanese male film actors
Japanese male television actors
21st-century Japanese male actors
Amuse Inc. talents
21st-century Japanese singers
21st-century Japanese male singers
Taiga drama lead actors